The meridian system (also called channel network) is a concept in traditional Chinese medicine (TCM). Meridians are paths through which the life-energy known as "qi" (ch'i) flows.

Meridians are not real anatomical structures: scientists have found no evidence that supports their existence. One historian of medicine in China says that the term is "completely unsuitable and misguided, but nonetheless it has become a standard translation." Major proponents of their existence have not come to any consensus as to how they might work or be tested in a scientific context.

History

The concept of meridians are first attested in two works recovered from the Mawangdui and Zhangjiashan tombs of the Han-era Changsha Kingdom, the Cauterization Canon of the Eleven Foot and Arm Channels  Zúbì Shíyī Mài Jiǔjīng) and the Cauterization Canon of the Eleven Yin and Yang Channels  Yīnyáng Shíyī Mài Jiǔjīng). In the texts, the meridians are referenced as mài rather than jīngmài.

Main concepts 
The meridian network is typically divided into two categories, the jingmai or meridian channels and the luomai or associated vessels (sometimes called "collaterals"). The jingmai contain the 12 tendinomuscular meridians, the 12 divergent meridians, the 12 principal meridians, the eight extraordinary vessels as well as the Huato channel, a set of bilateral points on the lower back whose discovery is attributed to the ancient physician Hua Tuo. The collaterals contain 15 major arteries that connect the 12 principal meridians in various ways, in addition to the interaction with their associated internal organs and other related internal structures. The collateral system also incorporates a branching expanse of capillary-like vessels which spread throughout the body, namely in the 12 cutaneous regions as well as emanating from each point on the principal meridians. If one counts the number of unique points on each meridian, the total comes to 361, which matches the number of days in a year, in the moon calendar system. Note that this method ignores the fact that the bulk of acupoints are bilateral, making the actual total 670.

There are about 400 acupuncture points (not counting bilateral points twice) most of which are situated along the major 20 pathways (i.e. 12 primary and eight extraordinary channels). However, by the second Century AD, 649 acupuncture points were recognized in China (reckoned by counting bilateral points twice). There are "12 Principal Meridians" where each meridian corresponds to either a hollow or solid organ; interacting with it and extending along a particular extremity (i.e. arm or leg).  There are also "Eight Extraordinary Channels", two of which have their own sets of points, and the remaining ones connecting points on other channels.

12 standard meridians
The 12 standard meridians, also called Principal Meridians, are divided into Yin and Yang groups. The Yin meridians of the arm are the Lung, Heart, and Pericardium. The Yang meridians of the arm are the Large Intestine, Small Intestine, and Triple Burner. The Yin Meridians of the leg are the Spleen, Kidney, and Liver. The Yang meridians of the leg are Stomach, Bladder, and Gall Bladder.

The table below gives a more systematic list of the 12 standard meridians:

Eight extraordinary meridians
The eight extraordinary meridians are of pivotal importance in the study of Qigong, Taijiquan and Chinese alchemy.  These eight extra meridians differ from the standard twelve organ meridians in that they are considered to be storage vessels or reservoirs of energy and are not associated directly with the Zang Fu, i.e. internal organs.  These channels were studied in the "Spiritual Axis" chapters 17, 21 and 62, the "Classic of Difficulties" chapters 27, 28 and 29 and the "Study of the 8 Extraordinary vessels" (Qi Jing Ba Mai Kao), written in 1578.

The eight extraordinary vessels are :
 Conception Vessel (Ren Mai) – 
 Governing Vessel (Du Mai) – 
 Penetrating Vessel (Chong Mai) – 
 Girdle Vessel (Dai Mai) – 
 Yin linking vessel (Yin Wei Mai) – 
 Yang linking vessel (Yang Wei Mai) – 
 Yin Heel Vessel (Yin Qiao Mai) – 
 Yang Heel Vessel (Yang Qiao Mai) –

Scientific view of meridian theory 
Scientists have found no evidence that supports their existence. The historian of medicine in China Paul U. Unschuld adds that there "is no evidence of a concept of 'energy' -- either in the strictly physical sense or even in the more colloquial sense -- anywhere in Chinese medical theory." 

Some advocates of traditional Chinese medicine believe that meridians function as electrical conduits based on observations that the electrical impedance of a current through meridians is lower than other areas of the body. A 2008 review of studies found that the studies were of poor quality and could not support the claims.

Some proponents of the Primo Vascular System propose that the putative primo vessels, very thin (less than 30 μm wide) conduits found in many mammals, may be a factor explaining some of the suggested effects of the meridian system.

According to Steven Novella, neurologist involved in the Skeptical movement, "there is no evidence that the meridians actually exist. At the risk of sounding redundant, they are as made up and fictional as the ether, phlogiston, Bigfoot, and unicorns."

The National Council Against Health Fraud concluded that "[t]he meridians are imaginary; their locations do not relate to internal organs, and therefore do not relate to human anatomy."

See also

 Acupuncture point
 Chakra
 List of acupuncture points
 Marma adi
 Nadi (yoga)
 Pressure points
 Glossary of alternative medicine

References

Acupuncture
Qigong
Vitalism
Pseudoscience